The 2019 KIOTI TRACTOR Tour Challenge was held from November 5 to 10, at the Pictou County Wellness Centre in Westville Road, Nova Scotia. It was the second Grand Slam event of the 2019–20 season.

In the men's tier 1 final, Brad Jacobs of Sault Ste. Marie, Ontario defeated Brad Gushue of St. John's, Newfoundland and Labrador to win his 5th Grand Slam. In the tier 2 final, Korey Dropkin defeated Tanner Horgan to earn a spot at the 2020 Canadian Open in January.

In the women's tier 1 final, Anna Hasselborg of Sundbyberg, Sweden defeated Kerri Einarson of Gimli, Manitoba to win her 3rd Grand Slam. In the tier 2 final, Kim Min-ji defeated Jestyn Murphy to earn a spot at the Canadian Open.

Qualification

The Tour Challenge consists of two tiers. For the Tier 1, the top 15 teams on the World Curling Tour Order of Merit rankings as of October 1, 2019 are invited. In the event that a team declines their invitation, the next-ranked team on the order of merit is invited until the field is complete. For the Tier 2, 16 teams are invited including the next top ranked OOM teams and regional teams.

Men

Tier 1
Top Order of Merit men's teams as of October 1:
 Kevin Koe
 John Epping
 Brendan Bottcher
 Niklas Edin
 Bruce Mouat
 Brad Jacobs
 Peter de Cruz
 Ross Paterson
 Brad Gushue
 Matt Dunstone
 Yannick Schwaller
 Glenn Howard
 Scott McDonald
 John Shuster
 Mike McEwen
 Jason Gunnlaugson

Tier 2
Order of Merit teams:
 Cameron Bryce
 Braden Calvert
 Korey Dropkin
 Mike Fournier
 Tanner Horgan
 Kirk Muyres
 Rich Ruohonen
 Karsten Sturmay
 Jaap van Dorp

Regional teams:
 James Grattan
 Scott Jones
 Jamie Murphy
 Greg Smith
 Chad Stevens
 Kendal Thompson
 Stuart Thompson

Women

Tier 1
Top Order of Merit women's teams as of October 1:
 Rachel Homan
 Anna Hasselborg
 Kerri Einarson
 Silvana Tirinzoni
 Jennifer Jones
 Chelsea Carey
 Tracy Fleury
 Satsuki Fujisawa
 Robyn Silvernagle
 Casey Scheidegger
 Eve Muirhead
 Sayaka Yoshimura
 Elena Stern
 Theresa Cannon
 Anna Sidorova
 Kelsey Rocque
 Seina Nakajima
 Isabella Wranå
 Mei Jie
 Jiang Yilun
 Gim Un-chi
 Nina Roth

Tier 2
Order of Merit teams:
 Megan Balsdon
 Corryn Brown
 Hollie Duncan
 Binia Feltscher
 Daniela Jentsch
 Kim Min-ji
 Jestyn Murphy
 Beth Peterson
 Laurie St-Georges
 Laura Walker

Regional teams:
 Mary-Anne Arsenault
 Suzanne Birt
 Jill Brothers
 Andrea Crawford
 Mackenzie Glynn
 Tanya Hilliard

Men

Tier 1

Teams
The teams are listed as follows:

Round-robin standings
Final round-robin standings

Round-robin results
All draw times are listed in Atlantic Time (UTC−04:00).

Draw 1
Tuesday, November 5, 7:00 pm

Draw 2
Wednesday, November 6, 8:00 am

Draw 3
Wednesday, November 6, 12:00 pm

Draw 4
Wednesday, November 6, 4:00 pm

Draw 5
Wednesday, November 6, 8:00 pm

Draw 6
Thursday, November 7, 8:00 am

Draw 7
Thursday, November 7, 12:00 pm

Draw 8
Thursday, November 7, 4:00 pm

Draw 9
Thursday, November 7, 8:00 pm

Draw 10
Friday, November 8, 8:00 am

Draw 11
Friday, November 8, 12:00 pm

Draw 12
Friday, November 8, 4:00 pm

Draw 13
Friday, November 8, 8:00 pm

Tiebreakers
Saturday, November 9, 8:30 am

Playoffs

Quarterfinals
Saturday, November 9, 4:30 pm

Semifinals
Saturday, November 9, 8:30 pm

Final
Sunday, November 10, 4:30 pm

Tier 2

Teams
The teams are listed as follows:

Round-robin standings
Final round-robin standings

Round-robin results
All draw times are listed in Atlantic Time (UTC−04:00).

Draw 1
Tuesday, November 5, 7:00 pm

Draw 2
Wednesday, November 6, 8:00 am

Draw 3
Wednesday, November 6, 12:00 pm

Draw 4
Wednesday, November 6, 4:00 pm

Draw 5
Wednesday, November 6, 8:00 pm

Draw 6
Thursday, November 7, 8:00 am

Draw 7
Thursday, November 7, 12:00 pm

Draw 8
Thursday, November 7, 4:00 pm

Draw 9
Thursday, November 7, 8:00 pm

Draw 10
Friday, November 8, 8:00 am

Draw 11
Friday, November 8, 12:00 pm

Draw 12
Friday, November 8, 4:00 pm

Draw 13
Friday, November 8, 8:00 pm

Tiebreakers
Saturday, November 9, 8:30 am

Saturday, November 9, 12:30 pm

Playoffs

Quarterfinals
Saturday, November 9, 4:30 pm

Semifinals
Saturday, November 9, 8:30 pm

Final
Sunday, November 10, 4:30 pm

Women

Tier 1

Teams
The teams are listed as follows:

Round-robin standings
Final round-robin standings

Round-robin results
All draw times are listed in Atlantic Time (UTC−04:00).

Draw 1
Tuesday, November 5, 7:00 pm

Draw 2
Wednesday, November 6, 8:00 am

Draw 3
Wednesday, November 6, 12:00 pm

Draw 4
Wednesday, November 6, 4:00 pm

Draw 5
Wednesday, November 6, 8:00 pm

Draw 6
Thursday, November 7, 8:00 am

Draw 7
Thursday, November 7, 12:00 pm

Draw 8
Thursday, November 7, 4:00 pm

Draw 9
Thursday, November 7, 8:00 pm

Draw 10
Friday, November 8, 8:00 am

Draw 11
Friday, November 8, 12:00 pm

Draw 12
Friday, November 8, 4:00 pm

Tiebreakers
Friday, November 8, 8:00 pm

Playoffs

Quarterfinals
Saturday, November 9, 12:30 pm

Semifinals
Saturday, November 9, 8:30 pm

Final
Sunday, November 10, 12:30 pm

Tier 2

Teams
The teams are listed as follows:

Round-robin standings
Final round-robin standings

Round-robin results
All draw times are listed in Atlantic Time (UTC−04:00).

Draw 1
Tuesday, November 5, 7:00 pm

Draw 2
Wednesday, November 6, 8:00 am

Draw 3
Wednesday, November 6, 12:00 pm

Draw 4
Wednesday, November 6, 4:00 pm

Draw 5
Wednesday, November 6, 8:00 pm

Draw 6
Thursday, November 7, 8:00 am

Draw 7
Thursday, November 7, 12:00 pm

Draw 8
Thursday, November 7, 4:00 pm

Draw 9
Thursday, November 7, 8:00 pm

Draw 10
Friday, November 8, 8:00 am

Draw 11
Friday, November 8, 12:00 pm

Draw 12
Friday, November 8, 4:00 pm

Draw 13
Friday, November 8, 8:00 pm

Tiebreakers
Saturday, November 9, 8:30 am

Playoffs

Quarterfinals
Saturday, November 9, 12:30 pm

Semifinals
Saturday, November 9, 8:30 pm

Final
Sunday, November 10, 12:30 pm

Notes

References

External links

November 2019 sports events in Canada
2019 in Canadian curling
Curling competitions in Nova Scotia
2019 in Nova Scotia
Pictou County
2019